Coldbrook is a Canadian suburban  community in Kings County, Nova Scotia. At the 2021 census, the population was 1,206.

History
A large farm in the area was named "Colebrook" after a community in Wales, but the village became known as Cold Brook Station in 1869 when the Windsor and Annapolis Railway arrived. The railway led to growth of two saw mills and a large apple export warehouse built in 1908 as well as a bulk oil depot in the late 1920s for White Rose Gasoline.  The United Fruit Companies apple growers co-op built a pair of large warehouses and a processing plant at Coldbrook in 1946. This plant later became the Scotian Gold Co-operative plant in 1957, which remains a large employer at its plant and retail store. Coldbrook became the "end of track" for the Dominion Atlantic Railway in March 1990 when the line abandoned all of its tracks west of Coldbrook. Rail service ended completely in 1993.

Demographics 
Coldbrook part A

Coldbrook part B

Together, they had a combined population of 1,206. This was a -4.6% decrease compared to the combined population from 5 years prior.

References

Communities in Kings County, Nova Scotia
Designated places in Nova Scotia